Events in the year 1950 in the Republic of India.

India got its independence from Britain in 1947, but still had a King. George VI, the King of United Kingdom was the King of India as well. Some provisions of the Indian Constitution had come into force on November 26, 1949. January 26, 1950 had been chosen as the day for full implementation of the Constitution making India a Republic and officially ending its ties to British monarchy.

Dr Rajendra Prasad was sworn in as the first President of the country on January 26, 1950.

Just a day before the birth of the Republic of India, the Election Commission of India was born.

Main body to devise and revise plans for the progress of India was envisaged, The Planning Commission.

Liaquat-Nehru Pact or Delhi Pact was signed between India and Pakistan in April. Refugees were allowed to return to their native country unmolested to dispose of their property in either country.

India and Nepal officially became friends. Though, India and Nepal has been ancient civilizations and have always had deep cultural relations, they did not have a bilateral treaty to guide their relations in the modern world. The 1950-India-Nepal Treaty of Peace and Friendship was signed. The new treaty allowed free movement of people and goods between the two countries.

Andaman and Nicobar Island's was handed over to India by England and Burma (Myanmar).

After 1947, the year of India's Independence, 1950 was indeed the next most momentous year.

Incumbents

 King of India – George VI (until 26 Jan.) 
 Governor-General of India – C. Rajagopalachari (until 26 Jan.)
 President of India – Rajendra Prasad took office on 26 January.
 Prime Minister of India – Jawaharlal Nehru
 Chief Justice of India – Sir H. J. Kania (from 26 Jan.)

Governors
 Assam: Sri Prakasa (until 27 May), Jairamdas Daulatram (starting 27 May)
 Bihar: Madhav Shrihari Aney
 Maharashtra: Raja Maharaj Singh
 Odisha: Asaf Ali
 Punjab: Chandulal Madhavlal Trivedi
 Rajasthan: Man Singh II
 Tamil Nadu: Krishna Kumarsinhji Bhavsinhji
 Uttar Pradesh: Homi Mody
 West Bengal: Kailash Nath Katju

Events
 National income - 102,216 million
 25 January – Election Commission is established.
 26 January – The Constitution comes into force making India a republic, the day is observed as Republic Day ever since and declares Kashmir and Jammu into the Indian state of Jammu and Kashmir, thus Kashmir becomes autonomous within the federation. India becomes the first republic in the Commonwealth of Nations.
 26 January – Dr. Rajendra Prasad moves into Rashtrapati Bhavan as the first President of India.
 8 April – Liaquat–Nehru Pact signed by Pakistan's Prime Minister Liaquat Ali Khan and Indian Prime Minister Jawaharlal Nehru in New Delhi
 15 August – The 8.6  Assam–Tibet earthquake shakes the region with a maximum Mercalli intensity of XI (Extreme), killing between 1,500–3,300 people.
 3 November - Air India Flight 245 crashed near Mont Blanc, France.
 13 December - A Douglas DC-3 Dakota flight of  Air India having a scheduled flight between Madras and Trivandrum International Airport crashed near Kotagiri on its descent to Coimbatore International Airport killing 20 people. The wreckage was discovered only after three days. The son of Travancore–Cochin Chief minister, C. Kesavan was also killed in the accident.
 Andaman and Nicobar Islands handed over to India by the United Kingdom and Burma

Law
 28 January – the Supreme Court of India is established, replacing both the Judicial Committee of the Privy Council and the Federal Court of India at the top of India's court system.
 5 June – Bihar High Court struck down Bihar Management of Estates and Tenures Act, 1949 as unconstitutional.
 31 July – Indo-Nepal Treaty of Peace and Friendship signed

Births

January to June

1 January – Deepa Mehta, Indian-Canadian director and screenwriter
5 January – Jagathy Sreekumar, comedian-actor.
9 January – Y. Gee. Mahendra, dramatist, actor, singer playwright and comedian.
14 January – Rambhadracharya, Hindu religious leader.
9 February – Kilimanoor Chandran, author, poet and columnist.
11 April – Leo Rebello, holistic health guru, author, human rights activist, world peace envoy.
20 April – N. Chandrababu Naidu, politician
21 April – Shivaji Satam, Indian actor
4 May – Konakalla Narayana Rao, politician and member of parliament from Machilipatnam.
13 May – J. M. Aaron Rashid, politician.
4 June – S. P. Y. Reddy , politician and member of parliament from Nandyal. (died 2019).
22 June – Tom Alter, film actor. (died 2017).

July to December

1 July – Ekram Ali, poet and critic.
19 August – Sudha Murty, social worker and author
11 September – Mohan Bhagwat, Sarsanghchalak of the Rashtriya Swayamsevak Sangh
17 September – Narendra Modi, Prime Minister of India
18 September
 Shabana Azmi, actress and social activist 
 Vishnuvardhan, Kannada actor (died 2009)
24 September – Mohinder Amarnath, cricketer.
26 November – Abhijit Sen, economist (died 2022)
12 December – Rajinikanth, film actor
20 December – Abul Kalam Qasmi, Urdu poet and critic (died 2021)

Deaths

14 April – Ramana Maharshi, Ancient Sage of the Modern Era (born 1879).
24 June – Darwan Singh Negi, recipient of the Victoria Cross for gallantry in 1914 (born 1881).
5 December – Sri Aurobindo, nationalist, scholar, poet, mystic, evolutionary philosopher, yogi and guru (born 1872).
15 December – Sardar Vallabhbhai Patel, political and social leader (born 1875).

See also 
 Bollywood films of 1950

References

 
India
Years of the 20th century in India